"Hate Bein' Sober" is a song by American rapper Chief Keef featuring fellow American rappers 50 Cent and Wiz Khalifa. Written alongside producer and frequent collaborator Young Chop, it was released on December 12, 2012 as the third single from the former's debut studio album, Finally Rich. The song peaked on the Billboard Bubbling Under Hot 100 Singles at number nine.

Controversy 
On November 16, 2012, Chief Keef was a no-show to the set of the video in Las Vegas for the song leaving guests 50 Cent and Wiz Khalifa to shoot other videos instead.

On May 21, 2013, Katy Perry tweeted her dislike for the song. Keef responded with a series of tweets threatening Perry and hinted that he would release a diss track aimed at her. Shortly afterward, the two recording artists reconciled.

50 Cent released the video for the single on April 29, 2020 via YouTube, sending out a tweet from his official Twitter account.

Charts

Certifications

References

2012 singles
2012 songs
Chief Keef songs
50 Cent songs
Wiz Khalifa songs
Songs written by Chief Keef
Songs written by 50 Cent
Songs written by Wiz Khalifa
Songs written by Young Chop

Interscope Records singles